Yves Sonan (born 1 May 1978) is an Ivorian sprinter. He competed in the men's 4 × 100 metres relay at the 2000 Summer Olympics.

References

1978 births
Living people
Athletes (track and field) at the 2000 Summer Olympics
Ivorian male sprinters
Olympic athletes of Ivory Coast
Place of birth missing (living people)